Naji Muhammad Shamil is a Lebanese actor.

Filmography

Plays
Waylon Le Omma - Shaker. 2013
I Reached to the 99. 2008

Dubbing roles
1001 Nights - Majid (first voice)
Batman: The Animated Series - James Gordon (Lebanese dub)
Mokhtarnameh - Khouly, Harmala ibn Kahel
Prophet Joseph
Samurai Jack (Classical Arabic version)
The Looney Tunes Show - Yosemite Sam (Lebanese dub)
The Powerpuff Girls - The Mayor of Townsville
The Powerpuff Girls (2016 TV series) - The Mayor of Townsville
Wabbbit - Yosemite Sam
Xiaolin Showdown - Master Fung

References
General
http://www.elfann.com/news/show/1087367/ناجي-شامل-يستذكر-والده-محمد-شامل-قضى-معظم-حياته-ال
http://www.addiyar.com/article/894068-بدأ-مع-مرعي-وافتتح-مهرجانات-بعلبك-مع-ناص-ناصيف-والرحابنة-واكتشف-شوشومحمد-شامل-من
http://www.elcinema.com/en/person/2102852

Specific

External links

Lebanese male actors
Lebanese male stage actors
Lebanese male voice actors